The 2011 Reading Express season was the sixth season as a professional indoor football franchise and their first in the Indoor Football League (IFL). One of twenty-two teams competing in the IFL for the 2011 season, the Reading Express were members of the Atlantic Division of the United Conference.

The team played their home games under head coach Mark Steinmeyer at the Sovereign Center in Reading, Pennsylvania. The Express earned an 8-6 record, placing 1st in the Atlantic Division.

Schedule
Key:

Regular season
All start times are local to home team

* Kickoff Classic week

Playoffs

Roster

Division Standings

References

Reading Express
Reading Express seasons
Reading Express